Indantadol (CHF-3381, V-3381) is a drug which was formerly being investigated as an anticonvulsant and neuroprotective and is now under development for the treatment of neuropathic pain and chronic cough in Europe by Vernalis and Chiesi. It acts as a competitive, reversible, and non-selective monoamine oxidase inhibitor, and as a low affinity, non-competitive NMDA receptor antagonist. A pilot study of indantadol for chronic cough was initiated in October 2009 and in April 2010 it failed to achieve significant efficacy in neuropathic pain in phase IIb clinical trials.

See also 
 2-Aminoindane
 Glycine

References 

Analgesics
Anticonvulsants
Antitussives
Monoamine oxidase inhibitors
NMDA receptor antagonists
2-Aminoindanes
Acetamides